Joseph Guiraud (Espéraza, 14 January 1929-Carcassonne, 17 April 2020), is a French former rugby league player who played as centre, halfback and five-eights and later, coach.

Career
He played for several clubs during his career. debuting for Lézignan, later, joining Carpentras and Montpellier before joining  Toulouse for a French Championship in 1965, finally ending his career for Limoux with a second French Championship title in 1968.
Thanks to his club-level performances, he represented France between 1956 and 1961, taking part at the 1960 Rugby League World Cup.

Personal life
Outside the pitch, he worked as wine-grower.

Honours

As player
Team honours :
French Champion  in 1965 (Toulouse) and 1968 (Limoux).
Runner-up at the French Championship : 1964 (Toulouse).

As coach
Team honours :
French Champion in 1968 (Limoux).

References

External links
Joseph Guiraud profile at rugbyleagueproject.com

1929 births
2020 deaths
French rugby league coaches
France national rugby league team players
Sportspeople from Aude
Limoux Grizzlies players
Toulouse Olympique players
Lézignan Sangliers players
Rugby league centres
Rugby league halfbacks
Rugby league five-eighths
French rugby league players